Fonimagoodhoo, often called Reethi Beach is an island  in the Baa Atoll in the Maldives. on the island is the Reethi Beach resort.

External links 
 The official webpage of the Reethi Beach Resorts
 The official webpage of the diving school Sea Explorer

Resorts in the Maldives
Island resorts